The Battle of Tres de Abril occurred in 3 April 1898, during the Philippine Revolution. It was fought in the city of Cebu, a month after the Revolt of Cebu began.

Battle
At 5 AM on 4 April, the rebels drove the Governor, General Montero, and his Spanish volunteers into Fort San Pedro and took control of Cebu City.  When the gunboat Maria Cristina opened fire, the rebels retreated to the Chinese quarter of Lutao.  On 7 April, 500 men of the 73rd Native Regiment and Spanish cazadores arrived under the command of General Tejeiro, and with the cruiser Don Juan de Austria, forcing the rebels to retreat to San Nicolas.  The Spanish continued their pursuit of the rebels on 8 April into the mountain region.

Aftermath
Leon Kilat was killed by his aide-de-camp, Apolinario Alcuitas, on April 8, 1898. The rebels then withdrew out of the city few weeks after he died. However, some of his generals, like General Maxilom, managed to capture some towns in the province such as Toledo and Balamban.

There is a commemorative monument for Leon Kilat on Kilat Street in Cebu City for the 3-day capture of Cebu City.

References

Sources

Further reading
 

Conflicts in 1898
1898 in the Philippines
Battles of the Philippine Revolution
History of Cebu City